The German Imperial Admiralty Staff was one of four command agencies for the administration of the Imperial German Navy from 1899 to 1918. While the German Emperor Wilhelm II as commander-in-chief exercised supreme operational command and control of the naval forces, the military staff was split into the Admiralty, the Naval Office, the Naval Cabinet, and the Inspector-General. The command structure had a negative impact on German naval warfare in World War I, as a professional head of the Imperial Navy, similar to the First Sea Lord, was not established until August 1918. After the war and the German Revolution of 1918–19, the Admiralty Staff became subordinate to the Naval Office and was finally disestablished by order of the German President.

History 
After the German unification of 1871, a united Imperial Navy was established as successor of the Prussian Navy and the North German Federal Navy, from 1 January 1872 under the authority of the German Imperial Admiralty (Kaiserliche Admiralität) led by Minister of State Albrecht von Stosch. With the accession of Emperor Wilhelm II in 1888, the naval forces strongly gained in importance. Soon after, the command structure was reorganized with the establishment of the Imperial Naval Cabinet, the German Imperial Naval High Command (Kaiserliches Oberkommando der Marine) and the Naval Office, from 1897 under State Secretary Alfred von Tirpitz.

In the course of the Anglo-German naval arms race, the Reichstag parliament in 1898 passed a new Naval Law, according to which the High Command was, on 14 March 1899, replaced  by the Admiralty Staff responsible for planning, officer training, and naval intelligence. In time of war the Admiralty Staff was to assume overall command of the Imperial Navy, although in peacetime it acted only in an advisory capacity. Direct control of the various elements of the fleet was subordinated to officers commanding those elements, accountable to the Kaiser.

This reorganization suited Wilhelm II, who wanted to maintain direct control of his ships. A disadvantage was that it split apart the integrated military command structure, which before had balanced the importance of the navy within overall defense considerations. It also suited Tirpitz, because it removed the influence of the admiralty staff from naval planning, but it left him the possibility, in wartime, to reorganise command around himself. Wilhelm II, however, never agreed to relinquish direct control of his fleet.

Chiefs of the Admiralty Staff 
(Chefs des Admiralstabs der Kaiserlichen Marine)

References 

 

Imperial German Navy
Staff (military)
1899 establishments in Germany
1918 disestablishments in Germany